Lewis Klahr (born 1956)  is an American animator and experimental filmmaker known for his collage work since the 1970s.

Style
He uses an assortment of pop culture imagery from the 1950s to the 1970s to deconstruct the romantic promises of the past.

Personal life
He is married to another experimental animator/filmmaker Janie Geiser.

Selected filmography
 Her Fragrant Emulsion (1987) 
 Hi-Fi Cadets (1989) 
 The Pharaoh's Belt (1993) 
 Altair (1995) 
 Lulu (1996) 
 Pony Glass (1998) 
 The Pettifogger (2011)  
 Sixty-Six (2015) 
 Circumstantial Pleasures (2020)

References

External links
Lewis Klahr on IMDB
Keep it in Motion-Classic Animation Revisited: 'Altair'-AWN
The Pharaoh's Belt-Wexner Center for the Arts

Living people
1956 births
Collage filmmakers
American experimental filmmakers
American animators
American animated film directors